Edward McKay Cheever Jr. (born January 10, 1958) is an American former racing driver who raced for almost 30 years in Formula One, sports cars, CART, and the Indy Racing League. Cheever participated in 143 Formula One World Championship races and started 132, more than any other American, driving for nine different teams from 1978 through 1989. In 1996, he formed his own IRL team, Team Cheever, and won the 1998 Indianapolis 500 as both owner and driver. The team later competed in sports cars.

His younger brother Ross Cheever, nephew Richard Antinucci and son Eddie Cheever III also became racing drivers.

Early life
Though born in Phoenix, Arizona, Cheever lived in Rome, Italy, as a child and attended St. George's British International School. He was introduced to motorsports at age eight when his father took him to a sports car race in Monza. He soon began racing go-karts and won both the Italian and European Karting Championships at age 15. He worked his way up through the levels of European Formula racing, teaming with fellow American Danny Sullivan in Formula Three in 1975. He scored a significant win against Gunnar Nilsson and Rupert Keegan at the end of 1975 and then driving for Ron Dennis' Project Four team in Formula Two in 1976, 1977, and 1978, finishing runner-up to René Arnoux in the 1977 championship. By the end of 1977, he was considered the most promising driver in the world outside F1, scoring wins in 1977 in F2 at Nurburgring and Rouen.

Formula One
After failing to qualify for the first two races of the year in Argentina and Brazil in a Theodore, he made the grid in South Africa in a Hesketh, but retired early. He then concentrated on Formula Two for the rest of 1978 and 1979.

For the 1979 F2 championship, Cheever left Project Four and joined the Italian Osella team, taking three wins and fourth overall in their BMW-powered FA2. In  Osella moved up to Formula One, Cheever piloting the team's Cosworth-powered FA1. However, the car was unreliable and Cheever managed just one finish all year, twelfth place at the team's home race in Italy.

The  season proved to be Cheever's high point in Formula One. He signed with the factory Equipe Renault team alongside Frenchman Alain Prost, both of whom were among the year's Championship favorites. Cheever earned four more podiums and 22 Championship points driving the Renault RE30C for the first two races before driving its much better replacement, the RE40, for the remainder of the season. But the team's disappointment after losing both the Drivers' (Prost) and Constructors' titles late in the season brought about the replacement of both Cheever and Prost. His best finish for Renault was second in the Canadian Grand Prix at the Circuit Gilles Villeneuve in Montreal, while earlier in the season he achieved his highest career qualifying position when he was second to teammate Prost at the French Grand Prix at the Paul Ricard Circuit. Unconfirmed rumors had Renault signing Cheever as the French manufacturer was looking to sell more cars in North America, and having an American driver in the factory-backed Formula One team would help that cause (there were three F1 races in North America in 1983 – Long Beach, Detroit and Canada).
In six more seasons, he never drove another truly competitive F1 car. After leaving Renault, Cheever had two unsuccessful seasons with Alfa Romeo as a teammate to Italian Riccardo Patrese. The thirsty and underpowered 890T V8 turbo engine used in the Alfas generally saw results few and far between, though it was generally believed Cheever outperformed his teammate despite failing to qualify for the 1984 Monaco Grand Prix. Patrese though scored the only podium finish for the team in those two years when he finished third in the 1984 Italian Grand Prix. Cheever had been third with six laps remaining but his Alfa ran out of fuel, handing the place to Patrese (the team had set Cheever's 890T engine for speed while setting Patrese for an economy run in the hope of a good finish).  was not helped by the team's car, the Alfa Romeo 185T, which proved to be extremely uncompetitive, forcing the team to upgrade its  car, the 184T to 1985 specifications and use it for the last half of the season, though the old car did not improve results despite proving slightly faster as the fuel issue remained. This was for the American owned and sponsored Haas Lola team at Detroit, as a replacement for the injured Patrick Tambay. Cheever actually qualified the unfamiliar Lola THL2 with its turbocharged Ford V6 engine in tenth position. Regular team driver,  World Champion Alan Jones, could only qualify his car 21st. Both Lolas retired with steering damage in the race, Jones on lap 33, Cheever 4 laps later. Cheever was only the third choice to replace Tambay for the race. Team owner Carl Haas had originally asked the lead driver in his CART team,  World Champion Mario Andretti to drive. Mario declined however but recommended his son Michael as a replacement. However, when Michael was unable to obtain a FIA Superlicence for the race, Haas turned to the experienced Cheever, who quickly agreed to an F1 comeback.

For , he was signed by Arrows team boss Jackie Oliver to partner British driver Derek Warwick (Cheever's appointment coincided with the U.S.-based USF&G financial group becoming the team's major sponsor). He secured third place at the 1988 Italian Grand Prix at Monza; at one stage, he was almost disqualified when his Arrows A10B's 150-liter fuel tank was found to actually contain 151 liters. Luckily, further examination revealed the tank size to be 149 liters and his third-place stood. The podium cost him a new pair of sunglasses for the chief mechanic. Monza, won by the Ferrari of Gerhard Berger, was the only time the McLaren-Hondas of Alain Prost and 1988 World Champion Ayrton Senna did not win a race in 1988. Cheever's third place in the 1988 Italian Grand Prix was also the final podium for the turbocharged l4 BMW M12 engine (badged as "Megatron" in 1987 and 1988). At the time, it was the oldest turbo engine in use in Formula One, having been first used by the Brabham team in 1982.

His final podium finish came at the 1989 United States Grand Prix in his birthplace of Phoenix, where he was involved in a race-long battle with the Williams-Renault of former Alfa Romeo teammate Riccardo Patrese for second place, but then had to give way at the later stages of the race when his brakes started to fade (he claimed that one of his front brakes had actually stopped working). Cheever's last race in Formula One was at the very wet 1989 Australian Grand Prix in Adelaide. During the last seconds of qualifying, he got out of shape coming out of the Fosters Hairpin onto the pit straight and clouted the wall hard with his Arrows A11-Ford, destroying the rear of the car. In the race he was the last to retire, spinning off on lap 42 after driving for many laps with another car's front wing lodged in his Arrows' sidepod.

During his final season in Formula One, Cheever remained competitive (when he finished, his average finishing place was seventh), but he became increasingly bemused by his inability to qualify well (his average qualifying position was 23rd, compared to Warwick's 14th). His best qualifying position for the season with 16th in both Canada and Hungary, and he even failed to qualify for the British Grand Prix at Silverstone and the Italian Grand Prix at Monza, where he had finished third the previous year.

In all, he participated in 143 Grands Prix, achieved nine podiums, and scored a total of 70 championship points. His best year was 1983, when he finished seventh in the championship, scored three podium finishes and one front row start for Renault.

CART

From 1986 to 1988, while still driving in Formula One, Cheever won ten sports car races for Jaguar. In 1990 he moved to the US to drive for Chip Ganassi Racing in the CART series. In his first attempt at the Indianapolis 500, he finished eighth and was named the race's Rookie of the Year, as well as CART's Rookie of the Year. In 1992, he qualified second for the race and finished fourth. In total, he scored four podium finishes in the series but never won. Driving for A. J. Foyt's team, Cheever came closest to victory at Nazareth in 1995; he was leading the race on the last lap when he ran out of fuel. In the Indy 500, Cheever was involved in a lap 1 crash with Stan Fox, Carlos Guerrero and Lyn St. James. Fox was severely injured in the crash.

Indianapolis 500 and Indy Racing League

In 1996 the Indy Racing League began, and Cheever moved there from CART. Cheever then set up his own team and had his first race as a driver/owner at New Hampshire later that year in August, which was the first race of the next season.

In 1998, all the pieces came together for Cheever when he took the biggest win of his career. He started from 17th position and led 76 of 200 laps to win the 82nd Indianapolis 500, despite sliding in the first turn of the race's first lap, helping bring out the race's first caution period. He was the first owner/driver to win the race since A. J. Foyt (one of Cheever's former bosses) in 1977.

Cheever's IRL team, active until July 2006, ran cars for Alex Barron and Patrick Carpentier in 2005. Having hung up his helmet in 2002, except for occasional instances such as the 2006 24 Hours of Daytona where he competed in the first race with his new Grand-Am series team, Eddie announced on February 21, 2006, he would come out of retirement to run his own car in the IRL's first four races, including the Indianapolis 500. He shut his team down after the eighth race of the season due to lack of sponsorship. The team continued to compete in the Grand-Am Rolex Sports Car Series.

Cheever provided television commentary on ABC for the IndyCar Series and the Indianapolis 500 from 2008 to 2018 with Allen Bestwick and Scott Goodyear, a former three-time runner-up in the Indy 500 who also drove for Team Cheever in 2001.

GP Masters

In 2005 Cheever competed in the GP Masters series which is open to former Formula One drivers over the age of 45. In the championship's first-ever event at Kyalami International Raceway in South Africa, Cheever finished in eighth position.  Cheever finished fourth in the second GP Masters race on April 29, 2006, at the Losail International Circuit in Qatar.

In the third GP Masters race on August 13, 2006, at the Silverstone Circuit in England, he took the victory under wet track conditions.

Racing record

Career summary

Complete European Formula Two Championship results
(key) (Races in bold indicate pole position; races in italics indicate fastest lap)

Complete Formula One World Championship results
(key)

Complete 24 Hours of Le Mans results

* Cheever was listed as DNS

American open-wheel
(key)

CART results

IRL IndyCar Series results

 1 The 1999 VisionAire 500K at Charlotte was cancelled after 79 laps due to spectator fatalities. Cheever qualified 18th.

CART career summary

Best race finish: 2nd (Phoenix – 1992), best championship result: 9th

IRL IndyCar career summary

Indianapolis 500

International Race of Champions results
(key) (Bold – Pole position. * – Most laps led.)

Complete Grand Prix Masters results
(key) Races in bold indicate pole position, races in italics indicate fastest lap.

References

 Eddie Cheever
 Wheel 2 Wheel: Eddie Cheever

External links

1958 births
Living people
24 Hours of Le Mans drivers
American expatriates in Italy
American Formula One drivers
Alfa Romeo Formula One drivers
Arrows Formula One drivers
Champ Car drivers
Karting World Championship drivers
European Formula Two Championship drivers
Rolex Sports Car Series drivers
Grand Prix Masters drivers
Haas Lola Formula One drivers
Hesketh Formula One drivers
Indianapolis 500 drivers
Indianapolis 500 Rookies of the Year
Indianapolis 500 winners
IndyCar Series drivers
IndyCar Series team owners
International Race of Champions drivers
Ligier Formula One drivers
Motorsport announcers
Osella Formula One drivers
Racing drivers from Phoenix, Arizona
Renault Formula One drivers
Theodore Formula One drivers
Tyrrell Formula One drivers
World Sportscar Championship drivers
Blancpain Endurance Series drivers
24 Hours of Spa drivers
24 Hours of Daytona drivers
Chip Ganassi Racing drivers
Jaguar Racing drivers
Cheever Racing drivers
A. J. Foyt Enterprises drivers
United Autosports drivers